Anatoliy Moshiashvili (born 11 March 1950 in Kutaisi, died on 14 August 2018 in Serbia) was a Georgian male former track and field hurdler who competed in the 110 metres hurdles for the Soviet Union.

His greatest achievement was a 60 metres hurdles gold medal at the 1974 European Athletics Indoor Championships, which he won in a championship record time. His winning time of 7.66 seconds still remains the Georgian national record for the event.

Among his other international performances were silver medals at the 1973 European Cup and 1973 Summer Universiade, as well as bronze medals at the 1968 European Junior Games, 1972 European Athletics Indoor Championships, and fourth place at the 1971 European Athletics Championships.

He was a five-time national champion, having won the 60 m hurdles three times straight at the Soviet Indoor Athletics Championships from 1972 to 1974, in addition to the outdoor title at the Soviet Athletics Championships in 1971 and 1973.

International competitions

National titles
Soviet Athletics Championships
110 m hurdles: 1971, 1973
Soviet Indoor Athletics Championships
60 m hurdles: 1972, 1973, 1974

See also
List of European Athletics Indoor Championships medalists (men)

References

External links

1950 births
2018 deaths
Male hurdlers from Georgia (country)
Soviet male hurdlers
Universiade medalists in athletics (track and field)
Universiade silver medalists for the Soviet Union
Medalists at the 1973 Summer Universiade
People from Kutaisi